Conostylis wonganensis, known as Wongan conostylis, is a perennial plant species in the family Haemodoraceae. It is an endemic of Southwest Australia that is threatened with extinction.

Taxonomy
The species was described by Stephen Hopper in 1982. The specific epithet refers to its restricted occurrence near Wongan Hills.

Description
A species of Conostylis, the Western Australian endemics known as coneflowers, allied to the species Conostylis teretiuscula, C. dielsii and C. caricina.
It is grass-like perrenial, attaining a size up to 200 mm high and 100 mm wide. The numerous narrow leaves are 1 mm wide, between 75 and 150 mm long, and grow from a rhizome beneath the surface. The color of the leaves is pale green, becoming yellowish brown at the base. The inflorescence is creamy to yellow colored, presented on flowering scapes 20 to 25 mm long. The flowering period is in either July, August or September.

Distribution
The distribution range of Conostylis wonganensis is restricted to an area around Wongan Hills and Manmanning. This reserve has been isolated from the extensive changes in land use in the surrounding Wheatbelt of Southwest Australia.

References

wonganensis
Plants described in 1982
Taxa named by Stephen Hopper